Mangoush or Al-Magoush or El-Mangoush with the definite article is an Arab surname. It may refer to:

Muhammad Ahmad al-Mangoush (born 1967), Libyan politician, General Secretary of People's Committee (Libyan Prime Minister)
Najla Mangoush, Libyan lawyer, politician and government minister
Yousef Mangoush (born 1950), Libyan Major General, Army Chief of Staff and government minister during Gaddafi's rule